Moșteni may refer to several places in Romania:

Moșteni, a commune in Teleorman County
Moșteni, a village in Ulmi Commune, Giurgiu County
Moșteni, a village in Schitu Commune, Olt County
Moșteni, a village in Furculești Commune, Teleorman County
Moșteni, a village in Frâncești Commune, Vâlcea County
Trivalea-Moșteni, a commune in Teleorman County
Cherleștii Moșteni, a village in Teslui Commune, Olt County
Logrești-Moșteni, a village in Logrești Commune, Teleorman County

See also 
 Moșna (disambiguation)
 Moșneni (disambiguation)